Thomas Burgherr (born 1 August 1962) is a Swiss businessman and politician. He currently serves as a member of the National Council (Switzerland) for the Swiss People's Party since 2015. He is the president of the Swiss People's Party of the Canton of Aargau.

Early life and education 
Burgherr was born 1 August 1962 in Zofingen, Switzerland to Hans and Elisabeth (née Hochuli) Burgherr. He was primarily raised in Wiliberg, a small municipality, in the Zofingen district of the Canton of Aargau. He attended the local public schools in Wiliberg and Reitnau. He completed an apprenticeship as a carpenter and completed several diplomas in this field (until the masters diploma in carpentry).

Professional career 
He is the owner, manager and chairman of Burgherr Moosersäge AG, a timber company, which is family-owned and operated since 1866. He is also a professor of carpentry at the University of Applied Science for Wood Working in Biel/Bienne.

Thomas Burgherr is president of the tunAargau Association. The association, which already exists in some cantons of Switzerland, wants to sensitize children and young people from 6 to 13 years for technical and scientific professions. As part of an adventure show, the children and young people are invited to a research laboratory and an adventure workshop. The sponsoring association tunAargau is a private initiative of industry, trade and commerce and is supported by the University of Applied Sciences Northwestern Switzerland.

Politics 
From 1992 to 2000 he was vice mayor in the municipality of Wiliberg. In 1997, he was elected to the Grand Council of Aargau and campaigned on the commissions for education, culture and sport (until 2005) and for the university of applied sciences (until 2001). Between 2005 and 2009 he was the president of the audit committee. In 2009, he was a member of the commission for economic affairs and Taxes. From 2012 to 2020 he was president of the Swiss People's Party Aargau, his successor was national councillor Andreas Glarner. In October 2015 he was elected to National Council and has since been a member of the state political commission.

Personal life 
Burgherr is married to Sabrina (née Leu) and has three children. He resides in Wiliberg.

References 

1962 births
Swiss politicians
Living people